Gasteracantha falcicornis is a species of spider belonging to the family Araneidae. It is found in eastern and southern Africa.

The female, larger and more colourful than the male, has a bright red abdomen decorated with many deep black pits. There is a long, curved black horn at each side and two shorter, straight horns at the front and rear.

References

falcicorni
Spiders of Africa
Spiders described in 1873